Whirled is the debut extended play by Australian alternative rock group Frente!. It was released in August 1991, and was released in 6 different coloured covers: brown, black, blue, gold, pink and yellow.

Background and release
Frente! were formed in Melbourne, as "Frente", in 1989 by Simon Austin on guitar and backing vocals, Angie Hart on lead vocals, Tim O'Connor on bass guitar, and Mark Picton on drums and recorder. The band spent two years performing in Melbourne's inner-city venues before, in August 1991, issuing their self-funded debut extended play, Whirled, on the Thumb Print label. It was produced and engineered by Owen Bolwell at Whirled Records in Richmond. Hart explained that the exclamation mark was added for the CD's cover art "[w]e don't write our name like that, but we thought we would on the CD covers because it looks good". One of Whirleds eight tracks, "Labour of Love", was voted by Triple J listeners to No. 69 on their Hottest 100 for 1991.

Track listing
 "Love and Terror" - 1:23
 "Oh Brilliance" - 1:59
 "Last to Know" - 1:17
 "Labour of Love" - 3:10
 "Risk" - 0:28
 "Baby Blue Sycophant" - 2:50
 "Testimony" - 1:27
 "Discipline and Deep Water" - 3:05

Personnel
 Bass – Tim O'Connor
 Drums, Recorder – Mark Picton
 Engineer, Producer – Owen Bolwell
 Guitar, Vocals – Simon Austin
 Harmonica – Chris Wilson
 Mastered By – Malcolm Dennis
 Photography [Cover] – Amanda Dalgleish
 Violin – Jane Schleiger
 Vocals – Angie Hart
 Written-By – Hart, Picton, Austin, O'Connor

References

External links

Frente! albums
1991 debut EPs
Indie pop EPs
EPs by Australian artists